Fables and Dreams is an album by Canadian bassist Dave Young with the Phil Dwyer Quartet, which was released in 1993 by Justin Time Records. It won the 1994 Juno Award for Best Mainstream Jazz Album.

References 

1993 albums
Phil Dwyer (musician) albums
Juno Award-winning albums
Justin Time Records albums
Dave Young (bassist) albums